Torsten Krentz (born 19 May 1966) is an East German sprint canoeist who competed in the late 1980s and early 1990s. He won four medals at the ICF Canoe Sprint World Championships with a silver (K-1 1000 m: 1989) and three bronzes (K-1 10000 m: 1990, K-4 1000 m: 1989, 1990).

Krentz also finished fifth in the K-2 1000 m event at the 1988 Summer Olympics in Seoul.

References

Sports-reference.com profile

1966 births
Canoeists at the 1988 Summer Olympics
German male canoeists
Living people
Olympic canoeists of East Germany
ICF Canoe Sprint World Championships medalists in kayak